O-Sensei is a fictional character in the DC Universe. He is a martial arts master who first appeared in Dragon's Fists, a novel by Dennis O'Neil and Jim Berry, starring Richard Dragon. His first DC Comics appearance was in Richard Dragon Kung Fu Fighter #1.

Fictional character biography

Pre/Post-Crisis
In the year 1895 a Japanese army captain stationed in Manchuria faced a Chinese captive in unarmed combat. Fearing his superior officer would lose the battle, a Japanese soldier shot the captive in the middle of the fight. This horrified the captain, who condemned the action, asserting that disgrace had been brought upon the entire Japanese army for this act. To atone, the captain honored the dying man's final request, pledging himself to take the man's place.

In memory of the victim, the captain began studying ancient scriptures, practicing the ancient disciplines, becoming a master in many ways. He lived a life pure in its austerity, its discipline and, finally, in its harmony. In 1900 he refused a plea from his wife to return to Japan. He agreed to her last request: "Promise your bones will rest with mine".

Almost 100 years later, the O-Sensei, as he was now called, had opened a dojo (in Japan, Pre-Crisis, although its location is not stated Post-Crisis and may have still been in China) and was teaching a young student named Ben Turner. One night a thief named Richard Dragon attempted to rob the dojo, but was caught and subdued by Turner. O-Sensei saw a spark in young Richard, and took him in. Bringing out a goodness that lay beneath their surface rage, O-Sensei trained Richard and Ben as brothers; in the space of six years the O-Sensei would create two of the greatest martial artists in the DC Universe. 

Once he felt there was nothing more he could teach them, the O-Sensei left the two. Turner and Dragon would join the service of a law-keeping organization known as G.O.O.D. (Global Organization of Organized Defense), occasionally seeking out their sensei's assistance and advice. At one point the two warriors came into conflict with Lady Shiva, one of O-Sensei's god-daughters, who had been tricked into believing Dragon had killed her sister.

Weary of being defeated by the likes of Batman and Wonder Woman, the villainous Doctor Moon had begun work on cultivating his own elite super-human guardians, opening "Dr. Moon’s Athletic Academy" in Brooklyn, whittling down the students to the strongest specimens and enhancing their strength artificially. His soldiers would be defeated by Dragon, Turner, and Shiva, which enraged Moon. Determined to tap into Dragon's strength he and his warriors travelled to China and, after a harrowing battle, captured the O-Sensei with the intention of forcing him to reveal all of his martial arts secrets. Despite agonizing torture, the old master remained defiant, promising his captors that "when I have died, I shall gladly answer your questions".

By chance, Dragon and Shiva had come to the Chinese monastery seeking the O-Sensei’s help in reviving a comatose Ben Turner. Despite the surprise visit, Moon’s troops rallied and managed to incapacitate Shiva. Meanwhile, Dragon found himself up against a martial artist that Moon had discovered in San Francisco—Sing, a one-time student of the late Bruce Lee. After watching the two men fight to a draw, Moon pulled out a gun to shift the odds back in Sing’s favor: "I admire Dragon. I was convinced Sing would break him. Yet Dragon is forever interfering with my plans. I slay him with great regret". Before he could fire, Moon was rendered unconscious when the O-Sensei applied nerve compressions to his neck.

Eventually, more than 150 years old, the O-Sensei decided he had lived long enough. Aided by Shiva, now the most feared martial arts assassin in the world, he asked Batman, The Green Arrow, and The Question to aid him in returning to Japan, in order to fulfill the vow he had made to his wife decades ago. Before Shiva and the others could return him to Japan, however, a typhoon washed the O-Sensei from his boat. Shortly afterwards, Lady Shiva learned that his wife had been lost at sea decades ago. Thus, the O-Sensei had fulfilled his vow.

DC Rebirth
In the rebooted New 52 / DC Rebirth continuity, O-Sensei is the headmaster of the Academy of the Bat, a secret training facility for China's Ministry of Self-Reliance, where prospective cadets strive to earn the cowl of the Bat-Man of China. While the cadets address him as Schoolmaster O, he is normally addressed as O-Shifu in China and O-Sensei in Japan. When the current Bat-Man of China, Wang Baixi, visits the academy with Peng Deilan, the Wonder-Woman of China, Baixi's fellow cadet and rival, Feng Rongpei, challenges Baixi for the cowl. Schoolmaster O approves of the challenge and hosts the duel in the academy's Gotham Arena. Despite Rongpei sabotaging the match in his favor, Baixi defeats him and retains his title. Rongpei takes Schoolmaster O by surprise and holds him at gunpoint with a grappling gun, demanding the cowl from Baixi. Baixi hands over the cowl, which contains a sleeping gas bomb that knocks Ronpei out. Schoolmaster O congratulates Baixi for his ingenuity.

In other media
O-Sensei makes his first cartoon appearance in the animated film Batman: Soul of the Dragon, voiced by James Hong. A legendary martial arts master, he is also caretaker of a sealed mystical gate and a Muramasa sword known as "Soul Breaker". When the gate is opened by his treacherous student Rip Jagger, O-Sensei sacrifices himself to seal the gate and prevent the evil god Nāga from escaping. Years later, millionaire Jeffrey Burr opens the gate again, allowing the god to emerge once more by possessing O-Sensei's body. O-Sensei's former students Bruce Wayne, Richard Dragon, Ben Turner, and Lady Shiva defeat him and Burr, and O-Sensei is freed of the god's influence through Soul Breaker, allowing him to finally die in peace.

References

See also
O-Sensei - a title often used to refer to Morihei Ueshiba, the founder of aikido.
DC Comics martial artists
Comics characters introduced in 1975
Characters created by Dennis O'Neil
Fictional martial arts trainers
Fictional Japanese people
Fictional aikidoka
Fictional characters with slowed ageing
Fictional characters without a name